The following is a list of stations owned or operated by Gray Television. Gray owns or operates 180 stations across 113 markets in the United States, ranging from as large as Atlanta, Georgia, to one of the smallest markets, North Platte, Nebraska.

Current stations 
Stations are arranged alphabetically by state and by city of license.
 (**) indicates a station that was built and signed-on by Gray.

Television

Radio

Former stations

Television

Radio

Notes

License ownership/operational agreements

Mergers and acquisitions

Satellites, semi-satellites and translators

Sources 
 

Gray Television